Otto Ferdinand Graf von Abensperg und Traun (or sometimes Otto Ferdinand von Abensperg und Traun), (27 August 167718 February 1748) was an Austrian Generalfeldmarschall. The current spelling of the name, and the spelling used in his time, is mostly Abensperg.

Life
He came of a Abensberg-Traun noble family and was born at Ödenburg as the son of Imperial Count Otto Laurenz von Abensperg und Traun (1638–1695) and his second wife, Eva Susanna Rüber von Pixendorf (1645–1695). He was sent to Halle to complete his education, but in 1693 left the university to serve with the Prussian contingent of the allied army in the Low Countries. He saw much service in the War of the Grand Alliance, and at its close entered the imperial army. The War of the Spanish Succession soon followed, and Traun served with distinction in Italy and on the Rhine till 1709, when he became lieutenant-colonel and aide-de-camp to Field Marshal Count Guido Starhemberg (1654–1737) in Spain.

A year later, for specially distinguished services, he was made colonel, and in 1712 chief of a regiment of foot. Soon after the close of the war he was again actively employed, and at the action of Francavilla in Sicily (20 June 1719) he received a severe wound. For his services in this campaign in southern Italy he was promoted to Generalfeldwachtmeister in 1723. In 1727 he became governor of Messina, and in 1733 attained the rank of lieutenant field marshal.

In 1734 he won a European reputation by his defence first of the pass of S. Germano and then of the half-ruined fortress of Capua during the southern Italian campaign of the War of the Polish Succession, which he surrendered, marching out with the honours of war on 30 November. He was at once promoted Feldzeugmeister and employed in a difficult semi-political command in Hungary, after which he was made commander-in-chief in north Italy and interim governor-general of the Milanese, in which capacity he received the homage of the army and civil authorities on the accession of Maria Theresa in 1740. In the following year he was made a field-marshal.

He successfully conducted the Italian campaigns of the War of the Austrian Succession up to 1743, when, on the death of Field-Marshal Count Khevenhüller, he was made the principal military adviser of Prince Charles Alexander of Lorraine, who commanded the Austrians in Bohemia and on the Danube. In this capacity he inspired the brilliant operations which led up to the passage of the Rhine and the skillful strategy whereby Frederick of Prussia was forced to evacuate Bohemia and Moravia (1744) without a battle.

Traun's last active service was the command of an army which was sent to Frankfurt to influence the election of a new emperor to succeed Charles VII. He died at Hermannstadt (Sibiu, present Romania) on 18 February 1748 and was buried in the local Jesuit Church.

See also
Abensberg-Traun
Traun (disambiguation)

Notes

References 

Attribution

1677 births
1748 deaths
People from Sopron
Counts of Austria
Field marshals of Austria
Austrian military personnel of the War of the Spanish Succession
Austrian military personnel of the War of the Polish Succession
Austrian military personnel of the War of the Austrian Succession
Austrian expatriates in Hungary
People of the Silesian Wars
Knights of the Golden Fleece of Austria
Otto